Wiersema is a surname. Notable people with the surname include:

John Wiersema (1955–2018), Canadian civil servant
Robert Wiersema (born 1970), Canadian writer
Dale Wiersema, curler

See also
Wiersma

English-language surnames